The Tennis at the 1973 Southeast Asian Peninsular Games was held between 3 September to 8 September at National Stadium, Singapore.

Medal summary

Medal table

References
 Yesterday's Results
 Yesterday's Results
 Yesterday's Results
 Yesterday's Results

1973 in tennis